Debra Ruh (born 1958) is an American business woman and advocate for the rights of persons with disabilities. She founded TecAccess, which provides software and services for information technology accessibility for people with disabilities and for Section 508 compliance.

Ruh is Chair of the United Nations's G3ict EmployAbility Task Force that supports information and communication assistive technologies and has assessed 104 countries regarding the implementation of the Convention on the Rights of Persons with Disabilities.

Career

Early career
In 1994, Ruh was hired by SunTrust Mortgage, now Crestar Bank, and worked into 1998 as vice president of training, development and quality control. Beginning in 1998, she worked as a banking consultant until 2001, and was at Market Street Mortgage in Tampa, Florida as vice president and distance-learning dean until 2000. She started Strategic Performance Solutions and was its chief executive officer (CEO) from 1999 to 2001.

TecAccess

In 2001, Ruh founded  TecAccess, a firm that designs online learning tools and websites for people with disabilities.  It received a United States Department of Labor's New Freedom Initiative Award. That year, Ruh received the "Rising Star" award from the National Association of Women Business Owners.

Other activities

In 2013, Ruh started Ruh Global Communications, which focuses on strategic communications and digital marketing. The firm develops solutions for people with disabilities and helps governments implement the United Nations Convention on the Rights of Persons with Disabilities (UNCRPD).

Ruh co-founded a social media venture – AXSChat (access chat) with Neil Milliken and Antonio Santos. It is a social media site about providing access and inclusion to those with accessibility needs. It was an event partner for the Paralympic Games in 2016. Ruh was coauthor of the article Helping Veterans with Disabilities Transition to Employment" with Paul Spicer and Kathleen Vaughan in a 2009 issue of Journal of Postsecondary Education and Disability.

Publications 

2018 – Inclusion Branding: Revealing Secrets to Maximize ROI.

2016 – Tapping into Hidden Human Capital: How Leading Global Companies Improve their Bottom Line by Employing Persons with Disabilities. ,

2013 – Find Your Voice using Social Media: Learn 101 Social Media Tips for Social Good

2009 White Paper – "Information Technology Accessibility: Yes We Can!" and her brochure  "Making the World of Technology Accessible" are on the White House website. They are two of about fifty posted documents in the Open Government Initiative.

Personal life
Ruh was born December 18, 1958, in Pensacola, Florida. She is married to Edward Ruh and has a son and a daughter. Edward, who worked in an IT department of a bank, joined TecAccess in 2006 and worked there for one year. He returned to TecAccess in 2008 and managed relationships with clients. Their working relationship featured in The Wall Street Journal article, "Married to the Job (And Each Other)" in 2011.

Notes

References

1958 births
Living people
Businesspeople from Florida
American technology company founders
American technology executives
American disability rights activists
American women company founders
American company founders
People from Pensacola, Florida
21st-century American women